is a Japanese whisky distillery. It is located near , the capital city of Miyagi Prefecture, Tōhoku region, Japan.

The distillery is owned by Nikka Whisky Distilling, and was opened in 1969.  Originally known as "Sendai distillery", it was the second to be established by Nikka Whisky, after the company’s Yoichi distillery in Hokkaido.

References

Notes

Bibliography

External links

Miyagikyo distillery – Nikka Whisky official site page about the distillery
Miyagikyo single malt whisky products – Nikka Whisky official site page about the distillery's single malt products
Miyagikyo Distillery – Learn About the Miyagikyo Distillery

This article is based upon a translation of the French language version as at May 2014.

Distilleries in Japan
Japanese whisky
Buildings and structures in Sendai
Companies based in Miyagi Prefecture
Food and drink companies established in 1969
1969 establishments in Japan
Japanese brands